Kozłów  is a village in the administrative district of Gmina Parysów, within Garwolin County, Masovian Voivodeship, in east-central Poland.

The village has a population of 310.

References

Villages in Garwolin County